Monochroa rufulella is a moth of the family Gelechiidae. It was described by Snellen in 1884.  It is found in Russia (Irkutsk).

The wingspan is about 14 mm. The forewings are light ochreous brown with slightly paler veins. The hindwings are light grey.

References

Moths described in 1884
Monochroa